Rasam is a 2015 Indian Malayalam-language film based on food, tastes, restaurants and catering services. The film was directed and co-written by Rajeev Nath. Nedumudi Venu, Rajeev Nath and Sudip Kumar co-written the screenplay of the story written by Sudip. It stars Mohanlal and Indrajith Sukumaran in lead alongside Nedumudi Venu, Devan and Varuna Shetty in supporting roles.

The principal photography commenced on 8 January 2014 at Doha. Filming underway at the locations in Doha, Dubai, Qatar, Kochi, Ottapalam and Thiruvananthapuram. Rasam released on 23 January 2015 and failed to impress the critics.

Plot summary

The film takes place in Doha where Shekar Menon, a business tycoon arranges his daughter's wedding to be done in a traditional Kerala style feast. Actor Mohanlal invites Valliyottu thirumeni to take up the catering for the wedding reception of the star's close friend Shekar Menon's daughter Janaki. Vasudevan, Balu and team fly to Doha. But circumstances force Balu to take over from his father. As the name suggests, food forms the central character in the film.

Cast
 Indrajith Sukumaran as Bala Shankar
 Varuna Shetty as Janaki, Menon's daughter
 Nedumudi Venu as Valliyottu Thirumeni
 Mohanlal as himself (cameo)
 Devan as Shekar Menon
 Jagadish as Abdhu
 Nandhu as Govindan Nair
 Mythili as Shahida
 Ambika Mohan as Mrs. Thirumeni
 Rajesh Rajan as Job
 Dileep Shankar
 Albert Alex as Josemon
 Satheesh Menon as Family Doctor
 Nihal Pillai as Manu
 Bindu K Menon as Mrs Menon

Casting
Mohanlal was signed in a cameo role as himself. In the film, he appeared as the friend of a leading businessman in Dubai. "Mohanlal has a pivotal role in Rasam as he is the one who mentors Indrajith in his work at the wedding in Dubai", says Rajeev. Indrajith plays Balu, a Namboothiri cook who runs a restaurant in Kerala. Balu is a B. Tech and MBA degree holder. He follows his father, a popular cook who is invited to Doha to do catering service for a marriage ceremony.

Varuna Shetty was cast as the heroine, her debut film in Malayalam. She does the role of Janaki, daughter of a Dubai-based business man. It is her wedding which centres the main plot in the film. Her father calls renowned chefs from Kerala to make a traditional Sadya for her wedding. Mythili is the other female lead in the film. Nihal Pillai is playing a villain role in the film.

Filming
The principal photography began on 8 January 2014 at Doha. The shooting was held in the restaurant Spice Boat, which is indeed the hotel owned by Indrajith's mother Mallika Sukumaran. The crew returned from Doha only by 13 January. The rest of the shoot progressed in Ottappalam. A Thiruvathirakkali of 300 artists was shot in Dubai. The film was shot in and around the Gulf regions. The shooting in Dubai was wrapped in two weeks and return to shoot in Ottapalam. In May, the film completed its shoot in Doha, Dubai, Kochi, and Thiruvananthapuram.

Music

The soundtrack consists of 3 songs composed by Job Kurian and sung by K. S. Chithra, Kavalam Sreekumar and Job Kurian himself. Lyrics are penned by Kavalam Narayana Panicker. Rasam makes the debut of musician turned composer Job Kurian. Previously he had co-composed the background score of a Kannada film. K.S Chithra had sung a traditional thiruvathira song and Kavalam Sreekumar sung a fun song on the occasion of a feast. Job Kurian's is a travel track in the drum and base genre with Indian elements.

References

External links
 

2010s Malayalam-language films
2015 films
Kerala cuisine
Films shot in Qatar
Films shot in Dubai
Films shot in Ottapalam
Films shot in Kochi
Films shot in Thiruvananthapuram
Films about food and drink
Cooking films
Films directed by Rajeevnath